Claudie Lange is a Belgian actress and model, mainly active in Italian cinema.

Lange entered the film industry at 21, when she met Federico Fellini during a vacation in Rome; Fellini gave her a minor part in Juliet of the Spirits (1965), and after that she appeared in The Bible (1966), the Roger Moore spy thriller Crossplot (1969), and in a large number of Italian genre movies, including the cult giallo films Death Walks on High Heels (1971) and Death Walks at Midnight (1972).

Filmography

References

External links

Living people
Belgian film actresses
Spaghetti Western actresses
20th-century Belgian actresses
Year of birth missing (living people)
Place of birth missing (living people)